The 1907 Tie Cup Final was the final match to decide the winner of the Tie Cup, the 8th. edition of the international competition organised by the Argentine and Uruguayan Associations together. The final was contested by Argentine Alumni and Uruguayan CURCC.

In the final, played at Ferro Carril Oeste Stadium in Caballito, Buenos Aires with a full attendance of 7,000, Alumni beat CURCC 3–1, with goals by Alfredo Brown (2) and Eliseo Brown. The Argentine club won its fourth Tie Cup trophy while its captain Alfredo Brown was acclaimed as "man of the match" by the crowd at Ferro C. Oeste.

Qualified teams

Venue

Overview 

Since this edition, Argentine and Uruguayan teams competed in their own competitions separately, with only the champions of the respectives Copa Competencia (Argentine and Uruguayan Cups) contested the final.

Alumni qualified for the final after having won the "Copa de Competencia Jockey Club", where the squad easily defeated all of its opponents, such as Porteño (8–0), Rosario Central (5–0), Reformer (5–0) and Reformer in the final (4–0). The match was held in Ferro Carril Oeste Stadium in Caballito on 29 September 1907, with an attendance of 7,000 spectators that filled the capacity of the venue.

With only 8 minutes played, CURCC forward Manito made a pass from the side to the Alumni's penalty area that hit one of goal posts before crossing the line, becoming the first goal of the match. Players of Alumni were surprised by the movement and did not react, thinking that a goal like that would not be possible. Five minutes later, Weiss made a long pass that Alfredo Brown finally connected to force a draw scoring for Alumni.

In the second half, Alumni had one player less on the field, nevertheless the Argentine side continued in offensive position, and after a corner kick, Juan Domingo Brown passed to his brother Alfredo, who dribbled three opponents before scoring the second goal for Alumni with a strong shot. Eliseo Brown scored the third goal for Alumni, securing a win that allowed Alumni to win their fourth title.

Match details

References

1907 in Argentine football
1907 in Uruguayan football
t
t
Football in Buenos Aires